Leona is a city in Leon County, Texas, United States. The population was 175 at the 2010 census.

Geography

Leona is located at  (31.154763, –95.975703).

Demographics

As of the census of 2000, there were 181 people, 71 households, and 48 families residing in the city. The population density was 83.2 people per square mile (32.1/km). There were 91 housing units at an average density of 41.8/sq mi (16.1/km). The racial makeup of the city was 83.43% White, 13.81% African American, 0.55% Asian, and 2.21% from two or more races. Hispanic or Latino of any race were 2.21% of the population.

There were 71 households, out of which 32.4% had children under the age of 18 living with them, 57.7% were married couples living together, 8.5% had a female householder with no husband present, and 31.0% were non-families. 31.0% of all households were made up of individuals, and 16.9% had someone living alone who was 65 years of age or older. The average household size was 2.55 and the average family size was 3.22.

In the city, the population was spread out, with 29.3% under the age of 18, 7.7% from 18 to 24, 26.0% from 25 to 44, 18.8% from 45 to 64, and 18.2% who were 65 years of age or older. The median age was 36 years. For every 100 females, there were 101.1 males. For every 100 females age 18 and over, there were 88.2 males.

The median income for a household in the city was $30,000, and the median income for a family was $37,083. Males had a median income of $27,500 versus $20,000 for females. The per capita income for the city was $17,725. About 4.8% of families and 11.2% of the population were below the poverty line, including 9.8% of those under the age of 18 and 16.7% of those 65 or over.

Education
The City of Leona is served by the Centerville Independent School District.

Popular culture 

The name of antagonist Leonard von Lutz from "Alaina Gleen: Imaginary Vacation" (also known as "Alaina Gleen 3") is probably from this community in combination with encompassing Leon County.

Notable people

 Albert Collins (1932–1993), musician

References

Cities in Texas
Cities in Leon County, Texas